Zuhur Habibullaev (1932April 8, 2013) was a Tajikistani artist. Born in Dushanbe, he graduated from Olimov State art College in Dushanbe in 1953 and Mukhin High industrial-art school in St. Petersburg in 1959.
He is a People's  Artist of the Republic of Tajikistan and Member of the Union of artists of Tajikistan and has given  international exhibitions from 1960. His works are located in  museums and private collections in Tajikistan, Russia, Europe and Asia.

References

Tajikistani artists
1932 births
People from Dushanbe